Les Diables (The Devils) is a 2002 French drama film from director Christophe Ruggia starring Adèle Haenel and Vincent Rottiers.

Plot

Joseph is a 12-year-old boy running from children's home to children's home with his autistic sister Chloé in tow. Chloé cannot bear to be touched, following only Joseph's commands as instruction. Joseph is fiercely protective of her as they flee the authorities to find their way home, back to the parents he believes abandoned them many years ago. They cling to a distant memory of a picturesque house, Chloé is able to construct it exactly the same each time, using the pieces of broken colored glass, she carries with her everywhere. Their plan is short-lived however, when they are caught and returned to yet another care home. Joseph wastes no time in stealing from his room-mates and demanding the two be left alone. Chloé makes great progress however with her carer, who is able to assess her condition and continue her care. Joseph quietly resents this new control in her life and is soon discovered to be a thief by his roommate, Karim, who develops a begrudging respect for him. Their situation worsens still when a figure from his and Chloé's past returns and reveals a secret which enrages Joseph who lashes out violently and flees with Chloé. 

Pursued through Marseilles as Joseph steals his way from one situation to the next, Chloé is determined to find the home she can picture so vividly. They meet up with Karim, himself escaped from children's care, with big plans about how he and Joseph can make money. Chloé leads them to a house she believes to be home. They break in and while Karim robs it, Chloé lovingly embraces her new surroundings. Joseph sees threat in this and burns the house to the ground, the three of them escaping the burning building. Chloé and Joseph share a moment where for the first time she allows Joseph to take her hand, as a reassurance she will not leave him. The police soon arrive, with Joseph hysterically dragged away and with Chloé this time placed in a secure psychiatric facility. Without Chloé, Joseph descends further into depression and violent behaviour, attempting even suicide. His life is saved by Karim, whose delinquent gang violently beats Joseph's accompanying officers to free him. Karim knows where Chloé is and the gang continues vandalizing their next stops. 

Joseph frees Chloe and they move to a tunnel in the city. Joseph pledges to make money and buy a home for his sister. He starts to steal for this accumulating money for moving from the tunnel to a better place. One night the police notices him and asks where he is going this late light. Joseph stabs and runs. Police chase him. He comes back to his hideout to move out with Chloe only to find the money he saved for them laying torn up by Chloe. Police reaches there and he gets injured. They escape and move around the city with the injury. Near the borders of the city the come to a home which Chloe shows interest. Joseph asks the person for coming in and needs helps because he was just in an accident. Joseph threatens the man to not to call the Police and they only want to rest. Joseph and Chloé's go to the backyard and Chloe gets interested in a swing set, Joseph guides her how to swing and she happily does it. Joseph looks at her endearingly and the screen fades into darkness.

Cast
 Adèle Haenel as Chloé
 Vincent Rottiers as Joseph 
 Rochdy Labidi as Karim  
 Jacques Bonnaffé as Doran 
 Aurélia Petit as Joseph's mother
 Galamelah Lagra as Djamel
 Frédéric Pierrot as The House Man

Production
Director Christophe Ruggia said the love scene between Adèle Haenel and Vincent Rottiers took them just enough time to shoot it: there is only one take.

In 2019 Haenel gave an interview claiming that director Christophe Ruggia had sexually harassed her from the time she was 12 to 15 after casting her in the film. Several crew members stepped forward to support her accusations and to say that they Ruggia had purposefully isolated Haenel and treated her inappropriately during filming. In 2020 Ruggia was officially charged with sexually harassing Haenel.

References

External links

2002 films
2002 drama films
2000s French-language films
French drama films
Films about autism
Films about children
Films set in Marseille
2000s French films